Kim Mu-che (fl. 11th century) was a scholar and educator under the Goryeo Dynasty, and founder of one of the Twelve Assemblies of Goryeo.  He passed the literary examination in 1035, and rose to a position of rank.  Under the reign of Munjong, Kim opened a private academy called Seowondo (西園徒, or "Western Garden Assembly"), which became one of the leading educational institutions of the kingdom.  This and the other Twelve Assemblies came to be preferred over the national academy (the Gukjagam).

See also
List of Goryeo people

Notes

References

11th-century Korean people
Korean educators
Year of birth unknown
Year of death unknown
Date of death unknown